Penicillium humicola is a species of fungus in the genus Penicillium.

References

Further reading
 
 
 

humicola
Fungi described in 1902